101.3 Grace Covenant FM (DXGC 101.3 MHz) is an FM station owned and operated by Iddes Broadcast Group. Its studios and transmitter are located at Purok 4, Brgy. Poblacion, Bacolod, Lanao del Norte.

References

External links
Grace Covenant FM FB Page

Radio stations established in 2015